Myron Boadu (born 14 January 2001) is a Dutch professional footballer who plays as a striker for Ligue 1 club Monaco and the Netherlands national team.

Born in Amsterdam, Netherlands, Boadu is of Ghanaian descent. He joined the AZ academy in 2013. In 2018 he made his competitive debut for the club in an Eredivisie match against PEC Zwolle. After struggling with long-term injuries, Boadu established himself as a regular in the AZ starting eleven during the 2019–20 season.

In international arena, Boadu has represented the Netherlands at the youth and professional level.

Club career

AZ
Born in Amsterdam to Ghanaian parents, Boadu started playing for SC Buitenveldert, before joining the AZ academy in 2013. He went through the youth ranks before being included in the reserve team prior to the 2016–17 season. On 3 September 2016, he made his debut for the AZ reserves in a match against Excelsior Maassluis, scoring in the 23rd minute. The reserves were crowned champions at the end of the third division season, reaching promotion to the Dutch second division. In 2017, Boadu was included in the first team of AZ, but was sidelined for almost the entire 2017–18 season due to a knee injury. On 6 May 2018, he made his professional debut for AZ in the last match of the Eredivisie season against PEC Zwolle. He came off the bench in the 67th minute, replacing Mats Seuntjens in a 6–0 home victory.

On 12 August 2018, Boadu scored his first professional goal in a match against NAC Breda. In doing so, he became the youngest player to score a goal for AZ in the Eredivisie, aged 17 years and 212 days. The following week he scored again in a match against FC Emmen.

In a home match against Feyenoord on 16 September 2018, Boadu broke his ankle after a collision with Eric Botteghin. He was subsequently ruled him out for seven months. He made his comeback for AZ on 20 April 2019, an away match, also against Feyenoord.

During the 2019–20 season, Boadu established himself as a starter for the AZ first team, and scored important goals in the Eredivisie as well as in the club's Europa League campaign. His goals against BK Häcken and Royal Antwerp in the qualifying rounds helped secure AZ's place in the group stage of the tournament.

Monaco 
On 4 August 2021, Monaco announced the signing of Boadu on a five-year deal. It is reported that the deal cost €17,000,000. On 26 September 2021 he provided an assist to Sofiane Diop to seal a 3-1 win at Clermont Foot. He scored his first goal for AS Monaco on 21 October in a 1-2 win against PSV Eindhoven in Europa League. He scored his third goal in three matches away for Monaco in a row against Saint-Etienne.

International career
On 19 November 2019, Boadu made his debut for the Netherlands national team in the UEFA Euro 2020 qualifying match against Estonia, scoring the fifth and final goal in a 5–0 victory. He also became the first player born in the 21st century to feature and score for the Netherlands national team.

Playing style 
Boadu has been cited as an example of a "modern poacher", a forward with an explicit focus on scoring goals. He is a product of AZ Alkmaar’s, a school which puts focus on drilling Dutch total football.

Career statistics

Club

International
Scores and results the Netherlands' goal tally first.

Honours
Individual
 Eredivisie Talent of the Month: February 2021

References

External links
 Profile at the AS Monaco FC website
 
 
 

2001 births
Living people
Association football forwards
Dutch sportspeople of Ghanaian descent
Dutch footballers
Netherlands youth international footballers
Netherlands under-21 international footballers
Netherlands international footballers
Eredivisie players
Eerste Divisie players
AZ Alkmaar players
Jong AZ players
AS Monaco FC players
Footballers from Amsterdam
Dutch expatriate footballers
Dutch expatriate sportspeople in Monaco
Expatriate footballers in Monaco
SC Buitenveldert players